Hadronectoridae is an extinct family of prehistoric coelacanth fishes which lived during the Carboniferous period. However, according to Actinistia, it could include Laugiidae, Rhabdodermatidae and not extinct Coelacanthiformes.

References 

 
Prehistoric lobe-finned fish families
Carboniferous extinctions
Carboniferous first appearances